The Rønne Formation is a geologic formation on the island on Bornholm, Denmark. It is of middle Hettangian to early Pliensbachian age. Vertebrate fossils have been uncovered from this formation. During the Early Jurassic, on what is now the Bornholm region was transitional between continental and marine settings with tidal influence. There was a lower delta plain, with lagoons and intertidal swamps. The formation is correlated with the lower Rya Formation and the upper Höganäs Formation of Skåne, Sweden.

Fossil content 
The Rønne Formation has provided many fossil flora.

Ichnofossils

See also 
 List of fossiliferous stratigraphic units in Denmark

References

Bibliography 
 

Geologic formations of Denmark
Jurassic System of Europe
Jurassic Denmark
Hettangian Stage
Pliensbachian Stage
Siltstone formations
Sandstone formations
Deltaic deposits
Shallow marine deposits
Paleontology in Denmark
Formations